Donald “Pug” Malinowski is an American former soccer goalkeeper who earned four caps with the U.S. national team in 1954 and 1955.

Club career
Malinowski grew up in Harmarville, Pennsylvania, where he played soccer with two local amateur teams, the Harmarville Hurricanes and Castle Shannon of the western Pennsylvania Keystone League from 1950 to 1962. Malinowski began his career with the Hurricanes before moving to Shannon for the 1953–1954 season. He was back with the Hurricanes in August 1954. Malinowski and the Hurricanes won the 1952 and 1956 National Challenge Cup. They were also runner up in 1953. Malinowski and his team mates also won the league title in 1951, 1953, 1954 and 1957.

National team
Malinowski earned four caps with the U.S. national team in 1954 and 1955. In 1954, he was the goalkeeper for the U.S. team in three qualifiers for the 1954 FIFA World Cup. The U.S. went 2–1 in those three qualifiers (including one shutout), but failed to qualify for the finals based on a 2–2 record. His last cap came in a loss to Iceland on August 25, 1955.

References

External links
 Newspaper article on Harmarville Hurricanes
 Hall of Fame eligibility profile

American soccer players
Association football goalkeepers
Harmarville Hurricanes players
People from Allegheny County, Pennsylvania
Castle Shannon SC players
United States men's international soccer players
Living people
Year of birth missing (living people)